The 1991 Seattle Mariners season was the 15th since the franchise's creation. Home attendance at the Kingdome was the highest to date, exceeding 2.1 million.

After the season, the contract of third-year manager Jim Lefebvre was not renewed, and he was succeeded by third-base coach Bill Plummer in 1992.

This was the last full season under owner Jeff Smulyan; the club was sold the following July.

Offseason
 November 25, 1990: Rich Amaral was signed as a free agent by the Mariners.

Regular season
 July 18: Ken Griffey Jr. and Omar Vizquel each had five hits in one game at Milwaukee.
 September 30: Nolan Ryan of the Texas Rangers struck out Tino Martinez of the M's for the 5,500th strikeout in his career. Griffey, age 21, became the youngest player in 35 years to reach 100 RBI in a season.
 October 4, The Mariners won their 82nd game over the Chicago White Sox, to finish with their first winning season in franchise history.

Season standings

Record vs. opponents

Notable transactions
 May 17: The Mariners traded cash and a player to be named later to the New York Yankees for Mike Blowers;  Jim Blueberg (minors) was sent to the Yankees on June 22.
 June 22: Randy Kramer was signed as a free agent by the Mariners.

Roster

Game log

Regular season

|-

|-

|-

|-

|-

|-

|-

|- style="text-align:center;"
| Legend:       = Win       = Loss       = PostponementBold = Mariners team member

Player stats

Batting

Starters by position
Note: Pos = Position; G = Games played; AB = At bats; H = Hits; Avg. = Batting average; HR = Home runs; RBI = Runs batted in

Other batters
Note: G = Games played; AB = At bats; H = Hits; Avg. = Batting average; HR = Home runs; RBI = Runs batted in

Pitching

Starting pitchers
Note: G = Games pitched; IP = Innings pitched; W = Wins; L = Losses; ERA = Earned run average; SO = Strikeouts

Other pitchers
Note: G = Games pitched; IP = Innings pitched; W = Wins; L = Losses; ERA = Earned run average; SO = Strikeouts

Relief pitchers
Note: G = Games pitched; W = Wins; L = Losses; SV = Saves; ERA = Earned run average; SO = Strikeouts

Awards and honors
 Harold Reynolds, second baseman, Roberto Clemente Award

Farm system

References

External links
1991 Seattle Mariners at Baseball Reference
1991 Seattle Mariners team page at www.baseball-almanac.com

Seattle Mariners seasons
Seattle Mariners season
Seattle Marin